Connellan is a suburb of the town of Alice Springs, in the Northern Territory of Australia.

Connellan is situated in the Arrernte traditional Aboriginal country. 

The suburb is named after the aviator Edward Connellan. Connellan is also the location of the Alice Springs Airport.

References

Notes

Citations

Suburbs of Alice Springs